The Standard J is a two-seat basic trainer two-bay biplane produced in the United States from 1916 to 1918, powered by a four-cylinder inline Hall-Scott A-7a engine. It was constructed from wood with wire bracing and fabric covering. The J-1 was built as a stopgap to supplement the Curtiss JN-4 in production.

Development
Charles Healy Day had designed the preceding Sloan H series of aircraft, and continued the line under the Standard Aero Corporation (later Standard Aircraft Corporation). Four companies, Standard, Dayton-Wright, Fisher Body, and Wright-Martin, delivered 1,601 J-1s between June 1917 and June 1918. The Standard J-1 can be differentiated from the Curtiss JN series by its slightly swept-back wing planform, triangular king posts above the upper wings, and the front legs of the landing gear which were mounted behind the lower wing's leading edge, just about where the forward wing spar of the lower wing panel attaches to the fuselage.

Operational history

Although produced in large numbers, its four-cylinder Hall-Scott A-7a engine was unreliable and vibrated badly. While JN-4 production outnumbered J-1s by about two to one to June 1918, fatalities in JN-4s versus J-1s numbered about seven to one as a result of the limited use of the J-1s. Few later production J-1s left their delivery crates.

In June 1918, all Standard J-1s were grounded, although training remained intensive. Sufficient JN-4s were available to meet training needs, and at $2,000 per aircraft it was not cost-effective to convert them to use Curtiss OX-5 engines. Contracts for 2,600+ JS-1s were canceled, and those not used for ground instruction by the US Army were sold as surplus or scrapped. Curtiss, which produced its competitor (the Curtiss JN) bought surplus J-1s which they modified with different powerplants, for resale.

Many J-1s were flown by civilian flying schools, and for joy-riding and barnstorming operations, until they were worn out, or were forced into retirement by new air transport legislation in 1927 which banned passenger aircraft with wood structures due to a number of high-profile accidents.

Variants

 Sloan H series: trainers and reconnaissance aircraft from 1913
 Standard H series: production by Standard of Sloan H-series
 Standard J: first Standard-designed variant
 Standard J-1: trainer for U.S. Army
 Standard SJ-1: J-1 with additional pair of forward wheels to prevent noseovers
 Standard JR-1: advanced trainer for US Army
 Standard JR-1B: mail carrier for US Post Office, modification of JR-1
 Standard E-4: redesignated JR-1B mailcarrier

War-surplus conversions

Aerial Engineering Corporation Standard 6W-3: Modification for a pilot and four passengers. Also known as the Mercury Standard 6
Curtiss Night Mail: 1922 mailplane conversion of J-1 by Curtiss with new wings (about 6 converted)
 Lincoln Standard L.S.5: J-1 modified with an open cockpit for four passengers
Nicholas-Beazley-Standard: J-1 aircraft modified by Nicholas-Beazley
 Ryan Standard: J-1 with a 180 hp Hispano Suiza engine and an enclosed cabin for four passengers fitted by the Ryan Flying Company (9 converted)
 Sikorsky Standard: civil trainer with Sikorsky-Gluhareff Parasol wing (also known as Standard SJ)

Operators
 
 United States Army Air Service
 United States Navy
 United States Post Office Department
 The San Diego—Los Angeles Airlines

Surviving aircraft

Over a dozen J-1s are on display or being restored. Others projects are incomplete and awaiting restoration.

 214 – J-1 on static display at the Yanks Air Museum in Chino, California.
 581 – J-1 airworthy at the Owls Head Transportation Museum in Owls Head, Maine. It has a Hispano-Suiza V-8 engine installed.
 1000 – J-1 airworthy with James F. Hammond of Yellow Springs, Ohio.
 1141 – J-1 on static display at the National Museum of the United States Air Force in Dayton, Ohio. It is displayed without a right wing or fabric covering, has a Hall-Scott A-4A engine installed, and was donated by Robert Greiger in December 1962.
 1582 – J-1 in storage at the Fantasy of Flight in Polk City, Florida. It is composite of two airframes.
 1598 – J-1 on static display at the San Diego Aerospace Museum in San Diego, California.
 1956 – J-1 airworthy at the EAA Aviation Museum in Oshkosh, Wisconsin. It has a Hispano-Suiza Model A engine installed.
 2434 – J-1 on display at the Fargo Air Museum in Fargo, North Dakota. It is on loan from Bonanzaville, U.S.A. It has an OXX-6 engine installed.
 2969 – J-1 airworthy with Walter C. Bowe of Sonoma, California. It is assembled from original components as a period kit.
 41236 – J-1 on static display at the Glenn H. Curtiss Museum in Hammondsport, New York. It is on loan from the Henry Ford Museum.
 T-4595 – J-1 at the Historic Aircraft Restoration Museum in Creve Coeur, Missouri.
 T-4598 – J-1 airworthy with the Freeman Heritage Collection in Kingsbury, Texas.
 T-4732 – J-1 airworthy with C C Air Corp of Port Hueneme, California.
 J-1 on static display at the National Museum of the United States Air Force in Dayton, Ohio. It has an OXX-6 engine installed.

Specifications (SJ)

See also

References
Notes

Bibliography

External links

 The Owl's Head Transportation Museum's Standard J-1 page

1910s United States military trainer aircraft
Standard Aircraft Corporation aircraft
Aircraft first flown in 1916